Arp is an unincorporated community in Banks County, in the U.S. state of Georgia.

History
A post office called Arp was established in 1880, and remained in operation until 1905. The community was named for humorist Bill Arp. In 1900, the community had 100 inhabitants.

References

Unincorporated communities in Banks County, Georgia
Unincorporated communities in Georgia (U.S. state)